De septem sigillis (On the Seven Seals) is the name of several works:

De septem sigillis (9th century), treatise falsely attributed to Alcuin
De septem sigillis (1190s), treatise usually attributed to Joachim of Fiore
De septem sigillis (c. 1227), treatise of Benedict of Bari

See also
Seven Seals